The Prior of Urquhart was the head of the Benedictine monastic community of Urquhart Priory in Moray. The Priory of Urquhart was merged with the Priory of Pluscarden in 1454. The following is a list of priors and commendators:
__

List of priors

 Richard, 1199 x 1200-1207 x 1208
 Thomas, 1226–1232
 William (I), 1237–1239
 John, 1248
 William (II) de Rathen, 1260/63-1295
 William (III) Butyrgak (Buttergask), 1343
 John Black, 1351 x
 Michael de Inverkeithing, 1358
 Robert, 1370
 Adam de Haddington, 1388–1391 
 John Mason, 1388
 William de Busby, 1391
 John de Torry, 1388
 Thomas de Dunfermline, 1395
 William de Anderston, 1413
 Robert de Dolas, 1416–1418
 Gilbert Smert, 1416
 William de Dalketh, 1416–1418
 Andrew Rabuzy (Raeburn?), 1418-1430
 Richard Bothwell, 1418
 John Schaw, 1430
 William Broun, 1430–1445
 William Durward, 1433–1434
 John Tenalay (Benally), 1445–1454

Notes

References
 Cowan, Ian B. & Easson, David E., Medieval Religious Houses: Scotland With an Appendix on the Houses in the Isle of Man, Second Edition, (London, 1976), p. 61
 Watt, D.E.R. & Shead, N.F. (eds.), The Heads of Religious Houses in Scotland from the 12th to the 16th Centuries, The Scottish Records Society, New Series, Volume 24, (Edinburgh, 2001), pp. 213–16

See also
 Abbot of Dunfermline
 Prior of Pluscarden
 Urquhart Priory

Urquhart
Urquhart